The CAC Woomera, also known as the CAC CA-4 and CAC CA-11, was an Australian bomber aircraft that was designed and constructed by the Commonwealth Aircraft Corporation during World War II. The order for the Woomera was cancelled before it became operational with the Royal Australian Air Force (RAAF).

Design and development
In early 1939, the Australian Government ordered large numbers of Bristol Beaufort bombers, with major components to be built in a variety of locations, including railway workshops, and in doing so it by-passed the local aircraft company, the Commonwealth Aircraft Corporation.

CAC, under Sir Lawrence Wackett, began work on its own design, hoping to out-perform the Beaufort by building a machine that could serve as both a torpedo-bomber and dive bomber. To keep down weight, Wackett dispensed with traditional self-sealing fuel tanks and opted to make the wing cavities liquid-tight, and thus serve as fuel storage. The Australian Government was initially uninterested in the CAC design. However, in mid-1940, cut off from the supply of British-made components for the Beaufort program (thanks to a British embargo on the export of aviation products, due to the need to maximise British production during the Battle of Britain), the Australian Government ordered a prototype of the CAC design, even before the Royal Australian Air Force had expressed a view about the machine. This prototype CA-4 took to the air on 19 September 1941. The CA-4 was a low-wing, twin-engined, multi-role bomber with a crew of three. It was armed with four nose-mounted .303 calibre machine guns and two remote-controlled twin machine-guns barbette mounted at the rear of the engine nacelles. It could carry either  bombs,  bombs or two torpedoes. It was originally powered by two Pratt & Whitney Twin Wasp R-1830-S3C3-G radials. Unfortunately, the novel fuel tanks never proved reliable, and in January 1943 the CA-4 prototype was completely destroyed in a mid-air explosion, probably due to a fuel leak.

With a re-designed tail and rudder, and an improved nose armament of two 20 mm cannon and two .303 (7.7 mm) calibre machine guns, the CA-4 became the CA-11 Woomera.

Production
Faced with the crisis caused by the Japanese entry into the war in December 1941, the RAAF accepted the design even before testing was complete, and ordered 105 examples of the CAC bomber on 8 March 1942. However, after the loss of the CA-4 prototype, the redesigned CA-11 did not fly until June 1944. By the time production was due to commence, the dive-bombing concept had fallen into disfavour and the RAAF was filling the light bomber/reconnaissance/strike role with British-designed Bristol Beaufighters (which were being made in Australia by the Department of Aircraft Production); US-made bombers, including the B-25 Mitchell, had also become available. Consequently, the original Woomera order was reduced from 105 to 20. After the first CA-11 flew, the whole program was cancelled and the production capacity set aside for Woomeras at CAC was switched to P-51 Mustang fighters.  The only completed CA-11 Woomera, A23-1, was stripped for parts and scrapped in 1946.

Loss of CA-4
On 15 January 1943, the prototype CA-4, A23-1001, crashed on a test flight to assess powerplant performance and evaluate aerodynamic effects of a new fixed leading edge slat. During the return to the CAC airfield at Fisherman's Bend, the pilot, Squadron Leader Jim Harper, had detected a fuel leak in the port Pratt & Whitney R-1830 engine. As the problem worsened he attempted to shut down the engine, feathering the propeller; however, the actuation of the feathering switch caused an explosion and uncontrollable fire. The wreckage was recovered and used for components.

Operators

Royal Australian Air Force

Specifications

See also

Notes

Bibliography
 Ewer, Peter. Wounded Eagle: The Bombing of Darwin and Australia's Air Defence Scandal. Sydney: New Holland, 2009. 
 Green, William. War Planes of the Second World War: Bombers and Reconnaissance Aircraft, Volume Seven. London: Macdonald, 1967. .
 Isaacs, Keith. "Wackett's Wonder". Air Enthusiast Quarterly, No. 1, n.d., pp. 52–65.

External links

adf-serials.com, 2003, "ADF Aircraft Serial Numbers RAAF A23 CAC CA-4/CA-11 Woomera"
War Time Plane Crash, Bylands, Vic. 1943

Woomera
1940s Australian bomber aircraft
Low-wing aircraft
Abandoned military aircraft projects of Australia
Aircraft first flown in 1941
Twin piston-engined tractor aircraft